Suniana is a genus of butterflies in the family Hesperiidae, the skippers. It is composed of three species, all native to the Australian faunal region, Australia and several surrounding island nations.

Suniana is sister group to the genus Ocybadistes.

Species
Suniana lascivia (Rosenstock, 1885) – dingy grass-dart, northern dingy-dart
Suniana subfasciata (Rothschild, 1915)
Suniana sunias (Felder, 1860) – wide-brand grass-dart, orange dart

References

External links
Suniana. Butterflies and Moths of the World. Natural History Museum.
Suniana. Funet.

Taractrocerini
Hesperiidae genera